Juglans boliviana, also known as Bolivian walnut, is a tree in the family Juglandaceae. According to a paper in 1960 entitled The Genus Juglans in South America and the West Indies by American horticulturist and botanist Wayne Eyer Manning, it occurs in the Andes of northern Bolivia. 

Wayne Manning included the species Juglans peruviana, described by French botanist Louis-Albert Dode in 1909 from nuts collected at an unknown locality in Peru, because the nuts closely match those of J. boliviana and apparently came from Metraro, where only J. boliviana is known.

References

Literature cited

boliviana
Trees of Peru
Trees of Bolivia